Los Corrales (Catamarca) is a village and municipality within the El Alto Department of Catamarca Province in northwestern Argentina.

References

Populated places in Catamarca Province